The 2011–12 West Coast Conference men's basketball season begins with practices in October 2011 and ends with the 2012 West Coast Conference men's basketball tournament from February 29- March 5, 2012 at the Orleans Arena in Las Vegas. The regular season begins on the weekend of November 11, with the conference schedule starting on December 29.

This is the sixty-first season under the West Coast Conference name. In July 2011, a new faith based, private school joined the conference. BYU came from the Mountain West, the conferences first change since 1980.

Pre-season
 Pre-season media day was held on October 27, 2011 at YouTube's headquarters in San Bruno, California.

2011–12 West Coast Men's Basketball Media Poll
Rank, School (first-place votes), Points
1. Gonzaga University (7), 63
2. Saint Mary's College (1), 56
3. Brigham Young University (1), 52
4. University of San Francisco, 42
5. Santa Clara University, 35
6. Loyola Marymount University, 27
7. University of Portland, 25
8. Pepperdine University, 13
9. University of San Diego, 11

2011–12 West Coast Men's Preseason All-West Conference Team
Player, School, Yr., Pos.
Brandon Davies, BYU, Jr., F
Matthew Dellavedova, Saint Mary's, Jr., G
Kevin Foster, Santa Clara, Jr., G
Rashad Green, San Francisco, Sr., G
Elias Harris, Gonzaga, Jr., F
Rob Jones, Saint Mary's, Sr., F
Nemanja Mitrovic, Portland, Sr., G
Robert Sacre, Gonzaga, RS-Sr., C
Drew Viney, Loyola Marymount, RS-Sr., F
Michael Williams, San Francisco, Jr., G

Rankings

 Gonzaga was ranked in the pre-season poll at No. 23.

Non-Conference games
 Loyola Marymount defeated #17 UCLA 69-58 on November 11, 2011.
 BYU would lose to #11 Wisconsin in the Championship of the Chicago Invitational Challenge 73-56 on November 26, 2011.
 BYU would lose to #6 Baylor at the Marriott Center 86-83 on November 26, 2011.
 Portland would lose at #2 Kentucky 87-63 on November 26, 2011.
 Loyola Marymount defeated #25 Saint Louis 75-68 on November 29, 2011.
 Saint Mary's would lose to #6 Baylor in the Las Vegas Classic 72-59 on December 22, 2011.
 Portland would lose at #23 Saint Louis 73-53 on December 3, 2011.
 The WCC would go 1-1 in BracketBuster games. LMU defeated Valparaiso 61-53 while Saint Mary's lost to #16 Murray State 51-65.
 The WCC posted an overall record of 6-7 against the Pac-12 Conference for the 2011–12 season.

Conference games

Composite Matrix
This table summarizes the head-to-head results between teams in conference play. (x) indicates games remaining this season.

Conference tournament

 February 29 – March 5, 2012 – West Coast Conference Basketball Tournament, Orleans Arena, Las Vegas, Nevada.

Head coaches
Dave Rose, BYU
Mark Few, Gonzaga
Max Good, Loyola Marymount
Marty Wilson, Pepperdine
Eric Reveno, Portland
Randy Bennett, Saint Mary's
Bill Grier, San Diego
Rex Walters, San Francisco
Kerry Keating, Santa Clara

Post season

NCAA tournament
 The WCC set a personal record with 3 teams going to the NCAA Tourney. Gonzaga was a 7-seed in the East and Saint Mary's was a 7-seed in the Midwest. BYU was a 14-seed in the West.
 BYU played in the First Four in Dayton, Ohio. During the game, they set a record for the largest comeback in an NCAA tournament game, as they were down by 25 points at one point and came back to beat the Iona Gaels 78–72. The largest previous deficit overcome in the tournament was 22 points by Duke against Maryland in the 2001 national semifinals. BYU advanced to Louisville where they would lose in the second round to the Marquette Eagles 88-68.
 Gonzaga received a bye to the second round, where they were sent to Pittsburgh. They managed to overwhelm current Big East and future Big 12 member West Virginia with their outside passing 77-54 to advance to the third round. The Big Ten's #7 ranked nationally Ohio State Buckeyes proved to be too much for Gonzaga as they squeaked by 73-66. Ohio State would advance to the Final Four.
 Saint Mary's received a bye to the second round and was sent to Omaha. They faced Big Ten Conference member Purdue and were upset 72-69.

NIT
 No WCC teams were selected for the 2012 NIT.

CBI
 San Francisco played at Pac-12 Conference member Washington State in the first round of the CiT. After keeping it within 5 points in the first half, Washington State used speed to pull away in the second half and advance 89-75. Washington State would go on to advance to the CBI championship.

CiT
 Loyola Marymount participated in their second consecutive CiT tournament. They would host first and second-round games. In the first round they beat Big West member Cal State Fullerton 88-79. In the second round it took overtime, but they managed to get by the Big Sky's Weber State Wildcats 84-78. In the third round they would visit the WAC's Utah State Aggies, and despite a fast-paced game, Utah State would use foul shots to pull away in the last 5 minutes 77-69. Utah State would go on to advance to the CiT championship game.

Highlights and notes

Awards and honors

Primetime Performers Honor Roll by Collegesports360.com
Matthew Dellavedova, Saint Mary's, Week of Jan 9-15

Scholar-Athlete of the Year

Player-of-the-Week

 Nov. 14 – Ashley Hamilton, Loyola Marymount
 Nov. 28 – Evan Roquemore, Santa Clara
 Dec. 12 – Angelo Caloiaro, San Francisco
 Dec. 26 – Kevin Pangos, Gonzaga
 Jan. 9 – Rob Jones, Saint Mary's
 Jan. 23 – Anthony Ireland, Loyola Marymount
 Feb. 6 – Brandon Davies, BYU
 Feb. 20 – Anthony Ireland, Loyola Marymount
 Nov. 21 – Kevin Pangos, Gonzaga
 Dec. 5 – Noah Hartsock, BYU
 Dec. 19 – Elias Harris, Gonzaga
 Jan. 2 – Brandon Davies, BYU
 Jan. 16 – Matthew Dellavedova, Saint Mary's
 Jan. 30 – Perris Blackwell, San Francisco
 Feb. 13 – Kevin Pangos, Gonzaga
 Feb. 27 – Elias Harris, Gonzaga

Player-of-the-Month
 November – Rob Jones, Saint Mary's
 December – Noah Hartsock, BYU
 January – Matthew Dellavedova- Saint Mary's
 February – Rob Jones, Saint Mary's

All-Americans

All West Coast Conference teams

Voting was by conference coaches:
Player of The Year: Matthew Dellavedova, Saint Mary's
Newcomer of The Year: Kevin Pangos, Gonzaga
Defensive Player of The Year: Robert Sacre, Gonzaga
Coach of The Year: Max Good, Loyola Marymount

ALL CONFERENCE: 

HONORABLE MENTION:

ALL-FRESHMAN

ALL-ACADEMIC

See also
2011–12 NCAA Division I men's basketball season
West Coast Conference men's basketball tournament
2011–12 West Coast Conference women's basketball season
West Coast Conference women's basketball tournament
2012 West Coast Conference women's basketball tournament

References